"Love Happens Like That" is a song recorded by American country music artist Neal McCoy.  It was released in June 1998 as the third single from the album Be Good at It.  The song reached #29 on the Billboard Hot Country Singles & Tracks chart.  The song was written by Aaron Barker, Ron Harbin and Anthony L. Smith.

Critical reception
A review in Billboard noted that the song had a light and breezy summertime feel that should find a comfortable home a country radio.  It also noted that producer Kyle Lehning's deft production touch provides the framework for McCoy to shine.

Chart performance

References

1998 singles
1997 songs
Neal McCoy songs
Songs written by Aaron Barker
Songs written by Ron Harbin
Songs written by Anthony L. Smith
Song recordings produced by Kyle Lehning
Atlantic Records singles